Sylvia Vaughn Thompson (born June 19, 1935) is an American food writer and chef. Thompson has written several cookbooks, including Feasts and Friends: Recipes from a Lifetime (1988), with a foreword by Thompson's godmother M. F. K. Fisher, and The Kitchen Garden Cookbook (1995).

Early life and education
Thompson was the daughter of film actress Gloria Stuart and playwright Arthur Sheekman. She was named after Stuart's character Princess Sylvia in Roman Scandals. Thompson grew up in California and Connecticut. She attended the Eunice Knight Saunders School and then Bancroft Junior High School in Los Angeles.

For a time, Thompson's family lived at the Garden of Allah Hotel. Neighbors included many film stars and celebrities. Thompson's mother was an amateur chef, and Thompson cooked for her parents' many dinner parties.

Thompson attended the University of California, Berkeley and studied abroad at the Sorbonne in Paris. She spent a college summer in San Michele di Pagana, Italy, continuing to expand her culinary references.

Career
Thompson married in the 1950s and moved to New York. She wrote food articles for Vogue magazine. In 1963 she published her first cookbook, Economy Gastronomy. The Budget Gourmet followed in 1974. The Washington Post stated that Thompson's early cookbooks "made cooking with next to nothing seem a great, swaggering adventure." However, her 1977 book Woman’s Day Crockery Cuisine was recalled by the publisher because one of the recipes recommended heating an unopened food tin in a manner that in one case caused it to explode.

Thompson is credited as a co-writer of her mother's memoirs, I Just Kept Hoping (1999).

Thompson's Feasts and Friends is part memoir, part cookbook. Thompson recounts food experiences at each stage in her life, offering recipes that reflect the various cultures that contributed to her upbringing, including San Joaquin Valley and Russian. The book was well received; a reviewer wrote that "few food writers can so casually capture the flavor of place -- and few are as lucky in the places that have come their way to capture: from a Hollywood childhood to Europe on a shoestring to the good life along the California coast."

Personal life 
Thompson married Gene Thompson in 1958, to whom she was introduced by M. F. K. Fisher's sister, Norah. They have four children, David Oxley Thompson, Dinah Vaughn Sapia, Benjamin Stuart Thompson, and Amanda Thompson.

References 

1935 births
Living people
American chefs
American cookbook writers
21st-century American women writers
20th-century American women writers
University of California, Berkeley alumni
American women chefs